Tom Whitehead may refer to:
 Clay T. Whitehead, known as Tom, United States government official
 Tom Whitehead (rugby league), English rugby league footballer

See also
 Thomas Whitehead (disambiguation)